Heo Sung-tae (born October 20, 1977) is a South Korean actor with over sixty film and television credits. He came to national prominence in the 2016 period thriller film The Age of Shadows and became known to international audiences with his role as Player #101 in Squid Game.

Early life
Heo was born in Busan, South Korea. He graduated from Pusan National University, where he majored in Russian. Prior to acting, he sold televisions in the Russian market for LG Corporation. He later joined the planning and coordination department of a shipbuilding company.

Career
Heo began his acting career in 2011, when he entered SBS's talent show Miraculous Audition (기적의 오디션). According to Heo, he drunkenly signed up to audition after seeing a commercial for the show.

He came to national prominence as Ha Il-soo in the 2016 period thriller film The Age of Shadows.Heo had to learn the Manchu language for his role in The Fortress (2017). Heo starred as the gangster Jang Deok-su in the 2021 Netflix original series Squid Game''.

Filmography

Film

Television

Web shows

Awards and nominations

References

External links
 
 
 Heo Sung-tae profile at Hanahreum Company

Living people
1977 births
Pusan National University alumni
South Korean male film actors
South Korean male television actors
Male actors from Busan
21st-century South Korean male actors